Robert Grzeszczak (born 8 October 1971 in Gniezno) is a Polish former field hockey player who competed in the 2000 Summer Olympics.

References

External links

1971 births
Living people
Polish male field hockey players
Olympic field hockey players of Poland
1998 Men's Hockey World Cup players
Field hockey players at the 2000 Summer Olympics
2002 Men's Hockey World Cup players
People from Gniezno
Sportspeople from Greater Poland Voivodeship